Sharp Chula Vista Medical Center is a hospital in Chula Vista, California, United States, established as a general community hospital in 1975 on Medical Center Dri. Sharp Chula Vista has 449 beds, including 100 skilled nursing beds and 9 neonatal intensive care unit beds.

History
Sharp Chula Vista Medical Center was founded in San Diego's South Bay area in a two-story house on F Street, which was converted into a 14-bed nursing home during World War II. It later expanded, became licensed for acute care, and was called Chula Vista Hospital.  Over the years, the hospital added a variety of programs and services, including a cardiac program and a convalescent center. In 1989, the board of directors affiliated the hospital with Sharp HealthCare and it became known as Sharp Chula Vista Medical Center In 1992.

In 2012, the emergency department (ED), which sees more than 60,000 patient visits a year, was expanded and renovated. The ED has 48 patient care beds and Rapid Medical Evaluation (RME) for minor injuries and illnesses prior to the Covid-19 Virus.

Also in 2012, the Douglas & Nancy Barnhart Cancer Center opened on the site. This cancer center is the first in San Diego to offer the TrueBeam STx radiotherapy/radiosurgery system, as well as radiation therapy suites with floor-to-ceiling windows. The cancer treatment program is certified by the American College of Surgeons and National Accreditation Program for Breast Centers (NAPBC).

The hospital employs more than 450 affiliated physicians and nearly 2,000 employees. More than 90,000 patients receive care there each year.

External links
 Official website
 This hospital in the CA Healthcare Atlas A project by OSHPD

Hospitals in San Diego County, California
Companies based in San Diego
Buildings and structures in Chula Vista, California